A side job, also informally called a side hustle or side gig, is an additional job that a person takes in addition to their primary job in order to supplement their income. Side jobs may be done out of necessity, when one's income from their main job is insufficient to support them, or simply out of a desire to earn more income. Working a side job can also, informally, be called moonlighting, usually when it is performed after normal working time. A side job can be a full-time job, part-time contract, or freelance work, and a person can hold more than one side job.

Side jobs gained in popularity in the U.S. due to wage stagnation and low wage growth that has not kept up with the rise in cost of living, with nearly a third of people with side jobs requiring them to pay expenses. Nearly half of all Americans report having a side job, including 43% of full-time workers. The most common reason workers take on side jobs is to obtain additional disposable income. In the United Kingdom, 60 percent of students and graduates reported having a side job, and 43 percent required it to pay renting expenses. Millennials are the most likely to have a side job, usually to have a financial "safety net", leading to them being considered the "side hustle generation". However, they are also common as a means to pay off student loans, as well as to leverage one's creativity in ways that would normally not be feasible in the typical workplace.

When a person's primary job only provides income so that they may pursue their preferred side job, it is typically known as a "day job".

See also
 Cottage industry
 Part-time contract
 Workaholic
Freelancer

References

Occupations
Employment classifications